The Military ranks of Switzerland are the military insignia used by the Swiss Armed Forces. The ranks have changed little over the centuries, except for the introduction, in 2004, of a new set of warrant officers. The ranks are worn on shoulder boards with the appropriate background colour. Designations are given in the four national languages (German, French, Italian and Romansh), with an English translation which is used during overseas missions.

Enlisted ranks

Enlisted troops

Non-commissioned officers (NCO)

Higher NCOs

Officers

Subaltern officers and captains

Staff officers, specialist

Higher staff officers
Higher staff officers wear black lampasses on the outside seam of dress uniform trousers.

Commander-in-chief of the Armed Forces

Shoulder board colour

References

Sources

External links
Swiss Armed Forces rank insignia as of 1 Jan 2006

Switzerland